Keith Howell Charles Allen (born 2 September 1953) is a Welsh actor, pantomime star and television presenter. He is the father of singer Lily Allen and actor Alfie Allen, and brother of actor and director Kevin Allen.

Early life
Allen was born on 2 September 1953 in Llanelli, Carmarthenshire, Wales, the second of three children of Edward Charles Owen, a Royal Navy petty officer submariner. His younger brother is actor Kevin Allen. He spent his early years near Swansea and in Malta, and most of his childhood in Gosport, Hampshire, while his father served in Portsmouth. At the age of 11, when his father was posted to Singapore, he was sent to board at Brentwood School, a public school in Essex. He was expelled from the school at the age of 13. At the age of 15 he was sent to a borstal after repeatedly being caught stealing, later saying that he "had a great time" there.

Career

Early work
After having several jobs during the 1970s, including a job as a stagehand from which he was sacked after joining Max Bygraves' chorus line on stage naked, Allen also worked as a stand-up comedian and vocalist, opening for rock bands such as The Clash.

Acting career
He appeared in a number of films in the series The Comic Strip Presents... on Channel 4 in the 1980s after becoming one of the breakthrough acts of the Comedy Store in 1979. Notable episodes featuring Allen include The Bullshitters (a parody of The Professionals), and The Yob (a parody of The Fly), which he also co-wrote. Allen would also appear alongside fellow Comic Strip alumni as Pestilence in The Young Ones episode "Interesting." Allen has performed both straight and comedy acting. In 1985 The Comic Strip hit the big screen with The Supergrass starring Allen, Adrian Edmondson, Peter Richardson, Jennifer Saunders and Robbie Coltrane, directed by Comic Strip actor Peter Richardson.

In 1986, he appeared in Comrades, a film about the Tolpuddle Martyrs.

During the brief period of British Satellite Broadcasting as an alternative satellite broadcaster to Sky, he had a regular comedy show of his own I Love Keith Allen on the Galaxy channel, a mix of stand-up and sketches. He appeared in the final Carry On film Carry On Columbus (1992) playing Pepi The Poisoner. It was directed by Gerald Thomas and produced by Peter Rogers.

Allen made a cameo appearance in the black comedy, Twin Town which was directed by his brother Kevin, the Channel 4 adaptation of A Very British Coup and he also played the lodger who dies at the beginning of Danny Boyle's thriller Shallow Grave (1994). In the same year, he was cast in a BBC adaptation of Martin Chuzzlewit. He was used again by Boyle to play a drug dealer in Trainspotting (1996). Danny Boyle has stated that Allen's character from Trainspotting is the same one that moves into the shared flat in Shallow Grave – he wears the same clothes. He also appeared disguised as a fictional hip-hop star 'Keithski' to present Top of the Pops on 19 July 1996.

In 2000, Allen appeared in two Harold Pinter plays at the Almeida Theatre, playing Lambert in Celebration and Mr Sands in The Room. These were performed again at The Lincoln Center Festival in July 2001.

In 2001, he played the character of "problem-solver" Jim Napeworth in an episode of Murder in Mind, and in 2004 cameod in Black Books as poker-player Dave 'Mouse Ears' Smith. In 2002 he played the London Records executive Roger Ames in 24 Hour Party People, a film about Factory Records and the Manchester music scene. Allen cameoed in the Channel 4 sitcom Spaced in a short homage to the Stanley Kubrick film, The Shining. He appeared as the villain in the sequel to 2004's Agent Cody Banks, Agent Cody Banks 2: Destination London, opposite Frankie Muniz. He appeared in the hospital drama, Bodies, as Mr Tony Whitman, a sarcastic but somehow likeable consultant obstetrician with an enormous ego. In 2005 he appeared in the Endemol-produced BBC Two television programme Art School alongside Ulrika Jonsson, John Humphrys and Clarissa Dickson Wright where he discovered a passion for painting. From 2006 to 2009, Allen appeared in the BBC's Robin Hood drama series, as the Sheriff of Nottingham.

Allen has also starred in pantomimes, such as an adaptation of Robert Louis Stevenson's Treasure Island in 2008. Written by Ken Ludwig and directed by Sean Holmes, he took the role of a gritty Long John Silver in the Theatre Royal Haymarket.

In September 2011, he appeared in the BBC six-part drama series The Body Farm as DI Hale. 2012 (2013 in the UK) saw the release of the Sara Sugarman comedy film Vinyl in which Keith played an ageing rock star who finds himself back in the public eye after his band member fools the music industry into giving them a record deal. In 2013, he played Darren the farmer in episode 1.5 of the comedy drama series Great Night Out.

In April 2013, Allen starred in a revival of Richard Bean's black comedy "Smack Family Robinson'" at The Rose Theatre, Kingston upon Thames.

In January 2021, Keith Allen played serial killer and rapist John Cooper in the ITV 3-part drama, The Pembrokeshire Murders.

TV presenter
Allen presented the TV show Whatever You Want in 1982, during the early days of Channel Four and has presented television documentaries for Victor Lewis-Smith's Associated-Rediffusion Television Productions: Little Lady Fauntleroy (2004), which saw Allen interview Lauren Harries and her family, You're Fayed (2005) and on Michael Carroll – King of Chavs (2006). In 2007 his documentary Tourette De France appeared on Channel 4, in which he travelled with a group of Scottish people with Tourette syndrome, including John Davidson, on an AEC Routemaster bus from London to the Parisian hospital where this condition was described by Georges Gilles de la Tourette in 1884. He also presented the British erotic direct-to-video series Red Tape.

Keith Allen Will Burn in Hell appeared on Channel 4 in June 2007, and showed Allen profiling the controversial Westboro Baptist Church, led by Fred Phelps, and speaking to members of the church and Phelps's family.

Allen presented the Manchester Passion, a contemporary retelling of the last few hours in the life of Jesus on Good Friday, 14 April 2006.

Keith Meets Keith, screened on 14 September 2009 on Channel 4, in which Allen tracked down TV chef Keith Floyd. The show contained what turned out to be Floyd's final interview for television, as he died of a heart attack on the evening the documentary was screened.

Allen's documentary film about the death of Diana, Princess of Wales, Unlawful Killing was intended for release in 2011. Mohamed Al-Fayed, the films only financial backer, contributed the film's £2.5 million budget. Allen argued in The Guardian that it detailed a "provable conspiracy after the crash". It accuses Queen Elizabeth and Princess Margaret of being "gangsters in tiaras" and Prince Philip of being a "psychopath". Allen said he refused to make 87 cuts asked for by lawyers to enable the film to be shown in Britain. His film was permanently shelved in 2012 after it became known it could not be screened in the United States as it was impossible to insure it against potential litigation.

Music
Allen was a member of London punk band the Atoms in the 1970s, and later Fat Les, a band which also featured artist Damien Hirst and Blur bassist Alex James.

In 1980 he starred as the Devil in a short movie called Meteor Madness which featured London Psychobilly band The Meteors. The film played in cinemas as the opening to the Two-Tone film Dance Craze which was released in February 1981. That was the only time Meteor Madness was shown, and it has never been released on video or DVD.

He was also closely associated with the band New Order, directing the video for their 1993 song "Ruined in a Day", which depicts Allen and the band members immersed in a bizarre game of charades with a group of Buddhist monks. He co-wrote their only UK number one single, "World in Motion", and occasionally performed with them live, including their headline show at the Reading Festival in 1998. He also appeared in the band's DVD New Order Story, where he played host to a fictional New Order game show.

Allen appeared as the businessman in the music video to Blur's 1995 hit "Country House".

He has been involved in several other football-related records, including "England's Irie" by Black Grape and wrote the lyrics for "Vindaloo" by Fat Les. He also contributed the song "On Me Head, Son" to the film Mike Bassett: England Manager, credited on the soundtrack album to Sporting Les.

Personal life
As a guest on Top Gear on 9 December 2007, Allen said that claims he had eight children were not true and that he actually has six children by four women. His children include pop singer Lily Allen and actor Alfie Allen with his first wife Alison Owen. He married his second wife, Nira Park, in 1997. After his divorce from Park, Allen became partners with actress Tamzin Malleson (who starred alongside him in Bodies), and the couple had a daughter, Teddie Allen, in 2006. They live in Stroud, Gloucestershire. In 2017, Allen and Malleson opened a diner in Stroud, built with the diner set of Kingsman: The Golden Circle which Allen recovered after shooting the film.

In the mid-1980s Allen served a 21-day jail sentence in Pentonville Prison after being found guilty of criminal damage at the Zanzibar club in Covent Garden.

Although a staunch socialist, whose political philosophy was influenced by the Workers' Revolutionary Party, Allen has expressed grudging admiration for Conservative Party politicians David Cameron and William Hague.

Allen has on his shoulder a tattoo of Rinka the dog, owned by Norman Scott, which was shot dead during the Jeremy Thorpe scandal. He has explained that: "I had the tattoo placed on my arm lest I forget, so I have a history of having suspicions about the establishment and the government and court cases".

He is a supporter of Fulham Football Club.

Selected filmography

Film

Television

Books

References

External links
 
 Guardian Unlimited profile

1953 births
Living people
20th-century British male actors
21st-century British male actors
British film directors
British male comedians
British male film actors
British male musicians
British male singer-songwriters
British male television actors
British socialists
British television presenters
Lily Allen
Male actors from Swansea
People educated at Brentwood School, Essex
People from Llanelli
People from Stroud
Actors from Gloucestershire
20th-century squatters
The Comic Strip
Welsh people of English descent